Stanislaus Lynch (1907–1983) was an Irish writer. His work was part of the literature event in the art competition at the 1948 Summer Olympics. Lynch was also an expert on hunting.

References

1907 births
1983 deaths
20th-century Irish male writers
Olympic competitors in art competitions
People from Ballyjamesduff